Ulta Palta is a 1998 Indian Telugu-language comedy film produced by P. Balaram under the Sri Anupama Productions banner and directed by Relangi Narasimha Rao. It stars Rajendra Prasad, Srikanya, Reshma, and Rani  and music composed by M. M. Srilekha. The film is a remake of the Kannada film of the same name (1997).

Plot
The film is a tale of two sets of identical twins whose names are also the same: Raja (Rajendra Prasad) & Ramu (Babu Mohan), who have been separated in childhood. One pair settled in the city, another in the village, both of know that they have siblings, but they don't know their whereabouts. The rest of the story is a humorous confusion drama on a day when one pair of Raja & Ramu from the village visit the city of the second pair of Raja & Ramu.

Cast

Rajendra Prasad as Raja & Raja (Dual Role) 
Srikanya as Radha
Reshma as Swathi
Rani as Mohini
Ali as Kumar 
Babu Mohan as Ramu & Ramu (Dual Role)
Tanikella Bharani as Raja's friend
Mallikarjuna Rao as S.I.
A.V.S. as Marvadi Seth
M. S. Narayana as Vice President
K. K. Sarma as Venkatrao
Chitti Babu as Party President's PA
Ashok Kumar as Raja's secretary
Jayalalita as Baby
Krishnaveni as Ramulamma
Kalpana Rai as Dr. Kanya Kumari
Y. Vijaya as Party President Bala Tripura Sundari

Soundtrack

Music composed by M. M. Srilekha. Music released on Supreme Music Company.

Other media
 VCDs and DVDs on VOLGA Videos, Hyderabad

References

External links

Modern adaptations of works by William Shakespeare
Films based on The Comedy of Errors
Twins in Indian films
Telugu remakes of Kannada films
Indian comedy films
1998 comedy films
1998 films
1990s Telugu-language films
Films directed by Relangi Narasimha Rao
Films scored by M. M. Srilekha